Barnówko-Mostno-Buszewo oil field is a Polish oil field that was discovered in 1993. It is one of the biggest on-shore oil fields in Poland. It began production in 1994 and produces oil.

References

Energy in Poland
Myślibórz County
Oil fields of Poland